A 2012 special election in Oregon's 1st congressional district was held on January 31, 2012, to fill a seat in the U.S. Congress for Oregon's 1st congressional district, following the resignation of Representative David Wu. Primary elections were held on November 8, 2011, with the Democrats selecting state senator Suzanne Bonamici and the Republicans selecting businessman Rob Cornilles.

Bonamici was declared the winner almost as soon as the ballot deadline expired at 8 pm PST. She carried every county in the district except Yamhill County, which Cornilles won by a seven-point margin.

Democratic primary
Ballots were due for the Democratic primary on November 8, 2011.

Candidates
The following candidates filed to run in the primary:
 Saba Ahmed, lobbyist and former engineer
 Brad Avakian, commissioner of the Oregon Bureau of Labor and Industries
 Suzanne Bonamici, state senator
 Dominick Hammon, former contractor
 Robert Lettin, investment adviser
 Todd Ritter, textbook dealer
 Dan Strite, golf professional and business owner
 Brad Witt, state representative

Polling

Results

Republican primary
Ballots were due for the Republican primary on November 8, 2011.

Candidates
The following candidates have filed to run in the primary:
 Rob Cornilles, businessman and unsuccessful 2010 nominee
 Pavel Goberman, fitness instructor and perennial candidate
 Jim Greenfield, real estate investor and film producer
 Lisa Michaels, activist and cable show host
 Delinda Delgado-Morgan, works with the International Union of Operating Engineers

Polling

Results

Independent primary
Oregon's cross nomination system, a form of fusion voting, allows a candidate for partisan public office to be nominated by up to three political parties. In November 2011, the Independent Party of Oregon held a primary, announcing the results on November 30. Suzanne Bonamici won the primary and was able list herself as the nominee of the Independent Party on the general election ballot.

Candidates
Suzanne Bonamici, Oregon state senator
 Rob Cornilles, businessman

Results

Special general election
Ballots were due for the special election on January 31, 2012.

Candidates
The following candidates will be on the ballot:

 Suzanne Bonamici, (Democrat, Independent), State Senator
 Rob Cornilles (Republican), businessman
 James Foster (Libertarian), computer programmer
 Steven Reynolds (Progressive), Army veteran

Polling

Results

See also
 List of special elections to the United States House of Representatives
 2012 United States House of Representatives elections in Oregon
 2012 United States House of Representatives elections
 2012 United States presidential election in Oregon
 2012 Oregon state elections

References

External links
Saba Ahmed campaign website
Brad Avakian campaign website
Suzanne Bonamici campaign website
Rob Cornilles campaign website
James Foster campaign website
Pavel Goberman campaign website
Jim Greenfield campaign website
Lisa Michaels campaign website
Delinda Morgan campaign website
Dan Strite campaign website
Brad Witt campaign website

1st
Oregon 1
2012 1 special
Oregon 2012 1
Oregon 1
United States House of Representatives 2012 01
January 2012 events in the United States